Vredenburgh is a town in Monroe County, Alabama, United States. It incorporated in 1912. At the 2020 census, the population was 222.

Geography
Vredenburgh is located at  (31.826518, -87.320686).

Demographics

As of the census of 2000, there were 327 people, 98 households, and 81 families residing in the town. The racial makeup of the town was 10.70% White, 88.99% Black or African American, and 0.31% from two or more races.

There were 98 households, out of which 41.8% had children under the age of 18 living with them, 38.8% were married couples living together, 37.8% had a female householder with no husband present, and 17.3% were non-families. 15.3% of all households were made up of individuals, and 5.1% had someone living alone who was 65 years of age or older. The average household size was 3.34 and the average family size was 3.72.

In the town, the population was spread out, with 37.6% under the age of 18, 10.7% from 18 to 24, 26.3% from 25 to 44, 17.1% from 45 to 64, and 8.3% who were 65 years of age or older. The median age was 28 years. For every 100 females, there were 78.7 males. For every 100 females age 18 and over, there were 67.2 males.

The median income for a household in the town was $27,321, and the median income for a family was $27,917. Males had a median income of $26,500 versus $10,833 for females. The per capita income for the town was $5,892. About 27.7% of families and 31.0% of the population were below the poverty line, including 35.3% of those under age 18 and 30.4% of those age 65 or over.

Notable people
Walter Bell, businessman and Alabama Commissioner of Insurance from 2003 to 2008
Dorothy Vredenburgh Bush, secretary of the Democratic National Committee, lived in Vredenburgh for several years
Moses Denson, former professional football player
John Drew, member of the Atlanta Hawks
Mike Stewart, author of mystery/suspense novels set primarily in the South

References

External links
 History of Vredenburgh

Towns in Monroe County, Alabama
Towns in Alabama